Michael Balboni (born May 12, 1959) is an American lawyer and politician from New York. He was a member of the State Assembly, the State Senate, and Deputy Secretary for Public Safety of the State of New York.

Political career
Balboni entered politics as a Republican. On February 20, 1990, he was elected to the New York State Assembly, to fill the vacancy caused by the election of Kemp Hannon to the State Senate. Balboni was re-elected four times and remained in the Assembly until 1997, sitting in the 188th, 189th, 190th, 191st and 192nd New York State Legislatures. In November 1997, he was elected to the New York State Senate, to fill the vacancy caused by the death of Michael J. Tully Jr. Balboni was re-elected several times and remained in the Senate until 2006, sitting in the 192nd, 193rd, 194th, 195th and 196th New York State Legislatures. As chairman of the Senate Committee on Veterans, Homeland Security and Military Affairs, he spoke out for New York's need to receive additional Homeland Security funds.

Because of his reputation for garnering support across party lines, it was rumored that he would seek the Republican nomination for Attorney General in 2006. That would have opened his competitive, strongly probably Democratic-leaning, district to a threat from the Democrats. He chose not to run after pressure from Senate Republican Leader Joseph Bruno, to help the Republican Party retain its slim majority in the State Senate. Balboni was re-elected in 2006, winning 56% of the votes.

On December 26, 2006, New York State Governor-elect Spitzer announced that Balboni would be appointed Deputy Secretary for Public Safety, requiring Balboni to resign his Senate seat.  The move triggered a special election on February 6, 2007. For political reasons, Balboni sided with the Democrats, and refused to endorse the Republican candidate, former friend and colleague Nassau County Clerk Maureen O'Connell, who lost the election to Democratic Nassau County Legislator Craig M. Johnson.

In his role as head of the NYS Office of Public Safety, Balboni oversaw homeland security and criminal justice agencies for Spitzer.  These include the State Police, Department of Corrections, Division of Criminal Justice Services, the Division of Parole, and Office of Homeland Security.  He coordinated homeland security and law enforcement policy, and served as state liaison to the U.S. Department of Homeland Security.

In January, 2009, Balboni announced he would be leaving the Paterson administration to work in the private sector as a partner with Navigators Global, a government relations and communications consulting firm.

In September, 2009, Balboni started Greater New York Health Care Facilities which is a non-profit trade association serving the needs of the long term care community in the greater New York metropolitan area and beyond, while currently serving as the Executive Director.

In August 2010, Balboni left his position at Navigators Global to join Cardinal Point Strategies as a Principle and Senior Vice President in their Government Solutions Group

In August 2012, Balboni became the Founder of RedLand Strategies, a consulting firm which sits at the intersection of Public Safety, Government Relations, Media Management and Business Development. Balboni currently serves as President and Managing Director.

References

External links
NYS Office of Homeland Security
Homeland Security Policy Institute
RedLand Strategies
Greater New York Health Care Facilities Association

1959 births
Living people
Politicians from Nassau County, New York
Republican Party members of the New York State Assembly
Republican Party New York (state) state senators
State cabinet secretaries of New York (state)
St. John's University School of Law alumni
People from East Williston, New York